Dunno Y2 ... Life Is A Moment is a 2015 Indian/Norwegian romantic drama film, directed by Tonje Gjevjon and Sanjay Sharma, starring Zeenat Aman,  Kapil Sharma, Yuvraaj Parashar, Meera and Sadia Khan. It is the sequel to the 2010 award-winning film Dunno Y... Na Jaane Kyon. The film explores a romantic and intimate relationship between two men of different nationalities, one Indian and one Pakistani. Dunno Y2 ... Life Is A Moment was released in India on 18 September 2015. Lead actors Kapil Sharma and Yuvraaj Parashar travelled to attend the international premieres of the film at the 2015 Filmfest homochrom in Cologne, Germany, and the closing night screening at Barcelona International Gay and Lesbian Film Festival in Spain, 2015 and Poland LGBT Film Festival 2016. May 2016 at Kashish Queer international film festival, June 2016 at My true colors New York International film Festival..
Dunno Y2 got best Film 1st runner up award at 6th DGLFF 2016 Durban South Africa Film Festival

Cast

 Kapil Sharma as Aryan
 Yuvraaj Parashar as Ashley
 Zeenat Aman as Nazneen
 Sadia Khan as Aisha
 Meera as Zahra
 Edith Roth Gjevjon as Edith
 Tonje Gjevjon as Tonje

Plot
The film follows a gay relationship between two young men: Aryan, from Pakistan and Ashley, from India. They meet in a sauna for men in Norway just a few days before Aryan is about to have his engagement party with his girlfriend Aisha. Through Aryan and Ashley's relationship, the viewer sees how humor, love and art can overcome the political and cultural differences between Norway, India and Pakistan.

Music
Nikhil Kamath wrote the score. The singers on the soundtrack includes Lata Mangeshkar and Salma Agha, who performed the song "Jeena Kya Hai, Jaana Maine, Jab Se Tumko Jaana.". This was Lata Mangeshkar's final playback performance before her death in 2022.

Release

Theatrical 
Dunno Y2... Life Is A Moment was released in India on 18 September 2015. Later that month Kapil Sharma and Yuvraaj Parashar travelled to Europe and USA to attend the international premiere of the film at the 2015 Filmfest homochrom in Cologne, Germany, and the closing night screening at Barcelona International Gay and Lesbian Film Festival in Spain and Poland LGBT Film Festival 2016.

References

External links
 
 Dunno Y 2, Official theatrical trailer, YouTube.com
 Dunno Y 2 - Life is a Moment trailer creates ripples, Hindu News
 Germany, Spain and Norway screenings for Dunno Y 2 - Life is a Moment, Times of India
 Gay baraat at the premiere of Dunno Y 2 - Life is a Moment in Mumbai, Times of India
 A legend and two veterans make a comeback in Dunno Y 2, Times of India
 Dunno Y2 at New York My True Colors Film festival http://timesofindia.indiatimes.com/entertainment/hindi/bollywood/news/Dunno-Y2-to-be-screened-at-a-film-fest-in-New-York/articleshow/52728431.cms

2015 films
2010s Hindi-language films
2015 LGBT-related films
Buddy drama films
Gay-related films
Indian buddy films
Indian LGBT-related films
LGBT-related drama films
2010s Norwegian-language films
Norwegian drama films
Norwegian LGBT-related films
2015 multilingual films
Indian multilingual films
Norwegian multilingual films
2015 drama films